The Gajirrawoong people, also written Gadjerong, Gajerrong and other variations, are an Aboriginal Australian people of the Northern Territory, most of whom now live in north-eastern Western Australia.

Language

Geoffrey O'Grady classified their language, Gajirrabeng or Gajirrawoong, as one of two Mirriwongic languages, the other being Miriwoong. More recent work has established it as a member of the Jarrakan group. Gajirrabeng is at severe risk of extinction, with no more than perhaps 2 or 3 native speakers by 2013. Frances Kofod compiled a dictionary of the language in 2007.

Country
Gadjerong lands encompassed  in Norman Tindale's reckoning. They ran westwards along the rich ecosystems of mangrove flat, waterholes, creeks and waterfalls along the coastal area from the mouth of the Fitzmaurice River as far as point where the Keep River flows out into the Joseph Bonaparte Gulf. Their inland extension, taking in also at Legune, went as far as the vicinity of Border Springs. They also frequented the offshore area of Quoin Island, and further north, Clump Island, and those off the mouth of Keyling Inlet.

Native title claims
The Gajirrawoong people were represented in a successful native title claim by the Kimberley Land Council in two joint claims with the Miriuwung people, as "Miriuwung Gajerrong". The Federal Court recognised the native title rights of the two peoples on 9 December 2003, nearly ten years after the claim had been lodged. Exclusive possession was recognised across several community-leased areas.

History
The implementation of the Ord River Irrigation scheme had a major impact on the Gadjerong and other peoples of the east Kimberley area. They were dispossessed of parts of their traditional tribal land and many sacred sites were destroyed. In consequence they moved to the Aboriginal reserve in Kununurra. The extension of the principle of equal pay for equal work in 1969 to Aboriginal people also had a negative impact on peoples like the Gajirrawoong in the Kimberley region and the Northern Territory, since the managers of pastoral leases evicted the majority of Indigenous peoples on the land where they lived, with the collateral loss of employment and its substitution by welfare subsidies.

Alternative names
 Kadjerawang
 Kadjarong, Kadjeroen
 Kujera
 Ginmu

References

Sources

Aboriginal peoples of the Northern Territory